Lutayev is a Slavic masculine surname, its feminine counterpart is Lutayeva. Notable people with the surname include:

Valentyna Lutayeva (born 1956), Ukrainian handball player 

Slavic-language surnames